David Machado (1938–1995) was a Brazilian maestro and a conductor.

Biography
He was born in 1938 in Cape Verde, he later immigrated to Brazil. He conducted in important orchestras in Brazil and abroad.  He graduated at the Freiburg Music Academy in Germany and was recognized for his wide repertory and at symphonies, along with an operator.  He was artistic director and the principal conductor of the Porto Alegre Symphony Orchestra twice, his first was from 1979 to 1980 after taking the post which was held by Pablo Komlós, a year later, his post was taken by Eleazar de Carvalho.  Also he conducted at the Rio de Janeiro Municipal Theatre's Symphonic Orchestra, the one at the Teatro Municipal de São Paulo, Minas Gerais Symphony Orchestra and titular conductor at OSSODRE (Orquesta Sinfónica do Servicio Oficial de Difusión, Radiotelevisión y Espectáculos Symphony Orchestra of the Official Service of Broadcasting and Spectacles) in Uruguay.  In Italy where he remained for 15 years he conducted the Sicilian Symphony Orchestra, the Orchestra of Teatro Massimo de Palermo and the Rome Opera.  He got important international awards and was invited to conduct some of the greatest symphony orchestras of the word which always took the special position with musical education of young Brazilians.  In 1982, he founded the Rio de Janeiro Youth Symphony Orchestra, in which the Young composer Andersen Viana in that time took parte as a violist. He was also the visiting professor at the Music School at the Federal University of Minas Gerais.  He conducted the Porto Alegre Symphony Orchestra for the last time from 1992 to 1993, he was succeeded by Cláudio Ribeiro.  He was married to Fiorella Soares, a violinist which continued the project Ação Social pela Música do Brasil (Social Action on the Music of Brazil) and attracted young people into the music, started by an NGO in 1995.  He died in 1999

Bibliography
Porto Alegre Symphony Orchestra, History of Artistic Directors

External links
Social Action on Music in Dona Marta  and Ação Social Pela Música in Chapéu Mangueira 

1938 births
1995 deaths
Brazilian conductors (music)
Brazilian people of Portuguese descent
20th-century conductors (music)